The following lists events that happened during 1932 in the Republic of Bolivia.

Incumbents
President: Daniel Salamanca Urey
Vice President: José Luis Tejada Sorzano

Events
September 7–29 - Battle of Boquerón

Births

Deaths

See also
Chaco War

References

 
1930s in Bolivia
Years of the 20th century in Bolivia
Bolivia
Bolivia